John Norman Foster (born May 17, 1978) is an American former professional baseball pitcher and currently pitching coach for the Chinatrust Brothers of the Chinese Professional Baseball League (CPBL).

Career
Foster was drafted by the Atlanta Braves in the 25th round of the 1999 Major League Baseball draft. In his rookie season, he went 1-0 with a 10.80 earned run average and 6 strikeouts.

On December 16, 2002, Foster was traded, along with Wes Helms, to the Milwaukee Brewers for Ray King. With Milwaukee, he went 2-0, with a 4.71 ERA and 16 strikeouts.

Foster was signed by the Atlanta Braves during the  season to provide the Braves with a left-handed relief pitcher, after the Braves had trouble with their Opening Day left-hander, Tom Martin. During the 2005 season, Foster posted a career low 4.15 ERA while working 34.2 innings in 62 games (both career highs). He also had career highs in walks (19) and strikeouts (32), as well as recording a career high 1 save.

On October 11, 2006, Foster was released by the Atlanta Braves. On October 30, Foster signed a minor league contract with the Kansas City Royals. In late March 2009 at the end of spring training, Foster retired from professional baseball.

On June 1, 2009, it was announced that Foster would be the new pitching coach for the Newport Gulls baseball team of the New England Collegiate Baseball League(NECBL).

He coached NCAA Division III Lehman College during the 2009 and 2010 seasons. Foster compiled an overall record of 14–43.

External links

1978 births
Living people
American expatriate baseball people in Taiwan
Arizona League Royals players
Atlanta Braves players
Azucareros del Este players
American expatriate baseball players in the Dominican Republic
Baseball coaches from California
Baseball players from Stockton, California
Danville Braves players
Delta College Mustangs baseball players
Greenville Braves players
Idaho Falls Chukars players
Indianapolis Indians players
Lehman Lightning baseball coaches
Lewis–Clark State Warriors baseball players
Major League Baseball pitchers
Milwaukee Brewers players
Myrtle Beach Pelicans players
New England Collegiate Baseball League
Omaha Royals players
Richmond Braves players
Wichita Wranglers players